Edmund Conen (10 November 1914 – 5 March 1990) was a German footballer who played as a striker.

Career
Conen was born in Ürzig, Germany. He played with FV 03 Saarbrücken, Stuttgarter Kickers, Mülhausen 93, HSV Groß Born (Pommern) and a couple of smaller clubs. In 1934, he was approached by Werder Bremen but, instead of joining them, told the DFB that Werder were dishing out financial offers to players. At that time football was still strictly amateur in Germany (officially) and payments to players were not permitted. The affair ended in the club and some of their officials, players and the team manager being fined and suspended.

With four goals in the 1934 FIFA World Cup in Italy, Conen was the joint second top scorer with Angelo Schiavio of Italy, behind Oldřich Nejedlý of Czechoslovakia who had five goals.

He played from 1934 to 1942 in 28 international matches for Germany and scored 27 goals.

Just 19 year old, Germany youngster Conen made quite an impact at the second FIFA World Cup with his three goals in his first match of the tournament against Belgium on 27 May. The game was tied at 2–2 before the powerful forward netted three times in the final 17 minutes to hand the Germans a 5–2 win in Florence, Italy. This achievement could only be equalized by Gerd Müller in 1970 against Peru. He managed to hit the winner when the Germans took the bronze medal with a 3–2 win in the play-off for third place against Austria.

Two years later as a 21-year-old, Conen's career was halted due to illness. This kept him away from football for three and a half years. Conen was courageous and battled through to return to the national team on 25 June 1939. On this date in Copenhagen against Denmark Conen made the perfect comeback, with a goal in the 2–0 victory. During World War II in 1942, he played his last international match. The German national team won this final match 5–3 Budapest against Hungary. Conen and Fritz Walter performed well for Sepp Herberger's team.

After end of war Conen worked as a coach, in the middle of the 1950s, with Eintracht Braunschweig in the North and Wuppertaler SV in the West. He later coached Bayer Leverkusen and later other teams from the city of Leverkusen like SV Schlebusch and BV Opladen. Conen died in the spring of 1990 in Leverkusen, only months before West Germany were to win their third World Cup championship.

Career statistics

Club

International

References

External links
International career statistics, The Rec.Sport.Soccer Statistics Foundation

1914 births
1990 deaths
People from Bernkastel-Wittlich
People from the Rhine Province
Association football forwards
German footballers
German expatriate footballers
German expatriate sportspeople in Switzerland
Expatriate footballers in Switzerland
1934 FIFA World Cup players
Germany international footballers
1. FC Saarbrücken players
Stuttgarter Kickers players
FC Mulhouse players
SC Young Fellows Juventus players
German football managers
SC Young Fellows Juventus managers
Eintracht Braunschweig managers
Bayer 04 Leverkusen managers
Wuppertaler SV managers
Footballers from Rhineland-Palatinate